Marcelo Euclides Visentín (30 May 1914 – 16 December 1998) was an Argentine water polo player who competed in the 1948 Summer Olympics and in the 1952 Summer Olympics.

References

1914 births
1998 deaths
Argentine male water polo players
Olympic water polo players of Argentina
Water polo players at the 1948 Summer Olympics
Water polo players at the 1952 Summer Olympics